MSO may refer to:

Orchestras
 Madison Symphony Orchestra, of Madison, Wisconsin, U.S.
 Melbourne Symphony Orchestra, of Melbourne, Victoria, Australia
 Melbourne Ska Orchestra, of Melbourne, Victoria, Australia
 Milwaukee Symphony Orchestra, of Milwaukee, Wisconsin, U.S.
 Montreal Symphony Orchestra, of Montreal, Quebec, Canada

Businesses and organizations
 Martha Stewart Living Omnimedia, a media and merchandising company 
 McLaren Special Operations of McLaren Automotive
 Mind Sports Organisation, a vehicle for promoting mental-skill games
 Mind Sports Olympiad

Science and technology
 Methionine sulfoximine, a chemical compound 
 Multiple system operator, an operator of multiple cable or direct-broadcast satellite TV systems
 Murashige and Skoog medium, a plant growth medium used in laboratories for cellular cultivation
 Mixed-signal oscilloscope 
 Monadic second-order logic, in mathematical logic

Transportation
 Michigan Southern Railroad (1989), reporting markm MSO
 Missoula Montana Airport, in Montana, U.S., IATA code MSO
 Moston railway station, in Manchester, England, station code MSO

Other uses
 Maritime security operations, combatting sea–based terrorism and other illegal activities
 Manufacturer Statement of Origin, or Manufacturer's Certificate of Origin
 Mountain Skies Observatory, in Wyoming, U.S.
 U.S. Navy hull code for ocean minesweeper
 Mars Science Orbiter, a proposed spacecraft 
 Municipal Services Office (Singapore), a government office